Ko Sarai is a subdistrict (tambon) in Mueang Satun District, Satun Province, Thailand. It is composed of 3 island groups, totaling 243 km2, and has a population of 5077 as of 2012 .

 The biggest village is Ban Ko Sarai (sometimes called Ban Yaratot Yai), on the island with the same name.
 The population relies on fishing, agriculture and tourism.
 Amongst the attractions, Ko Tarutao, Ko Lipe, Ko Adang.

Table of islands

See also
 Indian Ocean

Outline of Thailand
List of cities in Thailand
List of islands of Thailand

Notes

References

Geography of Satun province
Lists of coordinates
Tambon of Satun Province